Austroaeschna is a genus of dragonflies in the diverse family Telephlebiidae.

Species of Austroaeschna are brown to black large dragonflies with dull or brightly coloured markings. 
One species is found in south-western Australia, while other species of Austroaeschna are indigenous to eastern Australia.

Species
The genus Austroaeschna includes the following species:

 Austroaeschna anacantha  – western darner
 Austroaeschna atrata  – mountain darner
 Austroaeschna christine  – S-spot darner
 Austroaeschna cooloola  – wallum darner
 Austroaeschna eungella  – eungella darner
 Austroaeschna flavomaculata  – alpine darner
 Austroaeschna hardyi  – lesser Tasmanian darner
 Austroaeschna inermis  – whitewater darner
 Austroaeschna ingrid  - Grampians darner
 Austroaeschna muelleri  – Carnarvon darner
 Austroaeschna multipunctata  – multi-Spotted darner
 Austroaeschna obscura  – Sydney mountain darner
 Austroaeschna parvistigma  – swamp darner
 Austroaeschna pinheyi  – inland darner
 Austroaeschna pulchra  – forest darner
 Austroaeschna sigma  – sigma darner
 Austroaeschna speciosa  – tropical unicorn darner
 Austroaeschna subapicalis  – conehead darner
 Austroaeschna tasmanica  – Tasmanian darner
 Austroaeschna unicornis  – unicorn darner

References

Telephlebiidae
Odonata of Australia
Anisoptera genera
Endemic fauna of Australia
Taxa named by Edmond de Sélys Longchamps
Insects described in 1883